Elisa De Berti (Bovolone, 22 October 1974) is a Venetist politician from Veneto, Italy.

A member of Liga Veneta–Lega Nord, De Berti was elected mayor of Isola Rizza in 2009 and re-elected in 2014.

After the 2015 regional election, even though she had been an unsuccessful candidate in the province of Verona, she was appointed regional minister of Public Works, Infrastructures and Transports in Luca Zaia's second government. In the 2020 regional election De Berti was elected to the Regional Council from the province of Verona. Subsequently, she was appointed Vice President and minister of Legal Affairs, Public Works, Infrastructures and Transports in Zaia's third government.

References

Politicians of Veneto
1974 births
Living people
Venetist politicians
Lega Nord politicians
Mayors of places in Veneto
Women mayors of places in Italy
21st-century Italian politicians
21st-century Italian women politicians